Decca Records is a recording label. A division of Universal Classics, it is also known as Decca Music Group.

Classical

Vocal artists

 Roberto Alagna
 Ada Alsop
 Elly Ameling
 Arleen Auger
 Janet Baker
 Cecilia Bartoli
 Teresa Berganza
 Carlo Bergonzi
 Jussi Björling
 Barbara Bonney
 Olga Borodina
 Jean Borthayre
 Catherine Bott
 Roger Bourdin
 James Bowman
 Montserrat Caballé
 Nicole Cabell
 Joseph Calleja
 Giuseppe Campora
 José Carreras
 Carmen Cavallaro and his Orchestra
 Franco Corelli
 Fernando Corena
 Armand Crabbe
 Régine Crespin
 Maud Cunitz
 José Cura
 Libero de Luca
 Suzanne Danco
 Mario del Monaco
 Lisa Della Casa
 Alfred Deller
 Anton Dermota
 Giuseppe Di Stefano
 Plácido Domingo
 Otto Edelmann
 Margreta Elkins
 Kathleen Ferrier
 Dietrich Fischer-Dieskau
 Kirsten Flagstad
 Renée Fleming
 Juan Diego Flórez
 Mirella Freni
 Angela Gheorghiu
 Nicolai Ghiaurov
 Matthias Goerne
 Galina Gorchakova
 Hilde Gueden
 Thomas Hayward
 Judith Hellwig
 Roy Henderson
 Wolfgang Holzmair
 Marilyn Horne
 Dmitri Hvorostovsky
 Giovanni Inghilleri
 Jacques Jansen
 Sumi Jo
 Louis Jordan
 Endre Koreh
 Richard Lewis
 Wilma Lipp
 David Lloyd
 George London
 Emmy Loose
 Christa Ludwig
 Walther Ludwig
 Enzo Mascherini
 Karita Mattila
 Sylvia McNair
 Janine Micheau
 Sherrill Milnes
 Liza Minnelli
 Martha Mödl
 Birgit Nilsson
 Magda Olivero
 Jessye Norman
 Julius Patzak
 Luciano Pavarotti
 Peter Pears
 Alfred Poell
 Giacinto Prandelli
 Leontyne Price
 Margaret Price
 Ruggero Raimondi
 Samuel Ramey
 Maria Reining
 Katia Ricciarelli
 Mado Robin
 Helge Rosvaenge
 Erna Sack
 Heinrich Schlusnus
 Paul Schoeffler
 Andreas Scholl
 Renata Scotto
 Anja Silja
 Gérard Souzay
 Cheryl Studer
 Isabel Suckling
 Joan Sutherland
 Kiri Te Kanawa
 Renata Tebaldi
 Bryn Terfel
 Conrad Thibault
 Günther Treptow
 Hermann Uhde
 Giuseppe Valdengo
 Arnold van Mill
 Anne Sofie von Otter
 Jennifer Vyvyan
 Anthony Way
 Ludwig Weber
 Ljuba Welitsch
 Wolfgang Windgassen
 Marcel Wittrisch
 Laura Wright
 Sophie Wyss
 Eugenia Zareska

Conductors

 Otto Ackermann
 Leroy Anderson
 Franz André
 Ernest Ansermet
 Ataúlfo Argenta
 Vladimir Ashkenazy
 Krešimir Baranović
 Samuel Barber
 Thomas Beecham
 Sidney Beer
 Eduard van Beinum
 Anthony Bernard
 Leonard Bernstein
 Harry Blech
 Leo Blech
 Ernest Bloch
 Herbert Blomstedt
 Karl Böhm
 Richard Bonynge
 Adrian Boult
 Warwick Braithwaite
 Benjamin Britten
 Frans Brüggen
 Basil Cameron
 Sergiu Celibidache
 Riccardo Chailly
 Albert Coates
 Eric Coates
 Anthony Collins
 Piero Coppola
 Colin Davis
 Robert Denzler
 Roger Désormière
 Christoph von Dohnányi
 Antal Doráti
 Charles Dutoit
 Georges Enesco
 Alberto Erede
 Robert Farnon
 Iván Fischer
 Anatole Fistoulari
 Grzegorz Fitelberg
 Øivin Fjeldstad
 Wilhelm Furtwängler
 Pierino Gamba
 John Eliot Gardiner
 Valery Gergiev
 Walter Goehr
 Bernard Haitink
 Sir Hamilton Harty
 Christopher Hogwood
 Heinrich Hollreiser
 Robert Irving
 Herbert von Karajan
 Reginald Jacques
 Thomas Jensen
 Enrique Jordá
 István Kertész
 Royalton Kisch
 Erich Kleiber
 Hans Knappertsbusch
 Clemens Krauss
 Josef Krips
 Rafael Kubelík
 Franz Lehár
 Erich Leinsdorf
 Edouard Lindenberg
 Peter Maag
 Lorin Maazel
 Charles Mackerras
 Nikolai Malko
 Neville Marriner
 Jean Martinon
 Zubin Mehta
 Francesco Molinari-Pradelli
 Rudolf Moralt
 Charles Munch
 Karl Münchinger
 Riccardo Muti
 Boyd Neel
 Victor Olof
 Seiji Ozawa
 Philip Pickett
 André Previn
 Fernando Previtali
 Karl Rankl
 Victor Reinshagen
 Christophe Rousset
 Paul Sacher
 Malcolm Sargent
 Hermann Scherchen
 Hans Schmidt-Isserstedt
 Carl Schuricht
 Georges Sébastien
 Ivan Semenoff
 Sir Georg Solti
 Fritz Stiedry
 Robert Stolz
 Oscar Straus
 George Szell
 Stig Westerberg
 Mogens Wöldike
 Albert Wolff
 Eric Tuxen

Instrumentalists

 Valentina Lisitsa
 Salvatore Accardo
 Martha Argerich
 Claudio Arrau
 Vladimir Ashkenazy
 Wilhelm Backhaus
 Ellen Ballon
 Pierre Barbizet
 Antoine de Bavier
 Joshua Bell
 Yvonne Blanc
 Jacqueline Blancard
 Felicja Blumental
 Jorge Bolet
 Julian Bream
 Alfred Brendel
 Benjamin Britten
 Alfredo Campoli
 Kyung Wha Chung
 Aaron Copland
 Clifford Curzon
 Alicia de Larrocha
 Jeanne Demessieux
 Marcel Dupré
 Ludovico Einaudi
 Osian Ellis
 Mischa Elman
 Christian Ferras
 Julia Fischer
 Myers Foggin
 Pierre Fournier
 Nelson Freire
 Walther Frey
 Maurice Gendron
 Max Gilbert
 Arnold Goldsbrough
 Vicente Gómez
 Isador Goodman
 Frederick Grinke
 Arthur Grumiaux
 Friedrich Gulda
 Monique Haas
 Ida Haendel
 Håkan Hardenberger
 Clara Haskil
 Heinz Holliger
 Florence Hooton
 Peter Hurford
 Nobuko Imai
 Janine Jansen
 Leila Josefowicz
 Anton Karas
 Julius Katchen
 Peter Katin
 Wilhelm Kempff
 Zoltán Kocsis
 Gidon Kremer
 Georg Kulenkampff
 Charlie Kunz
 Katia and Marielle Labèque
 Alexandre Lagoya
 Chad Lawson
 Kathleen Long
 Radu Lupu
 Moura Lympany
 Nikita Magaloff
 Enrico Mainardi
 George Malcolm
 Stephan Moccio
 Viktoria Mullova
 Kaori Muraji
 Zara Nelsova
 David Oistrakh
 Franz Osborn
 Kun Woo Paik
 Walter Panhoffer
 Itzhak Perlman
 Anthony Pini
 André Previn
 Ossy Renardy
 Ruggiero Ricci
 Sviatoslav Richter
 Pascal Rogé
 Pepe Romero
 Max Rostal
 Mstislav Rostropovich
 Christophe Rousset
 Joseph Saxby
 András Schiff
 Heinrich Schiff
 Andrés Segovia
 Guilhermina Suggia
 Akiko Suwanai
 Henryk Szeryng
 Jean-Yves Thibaudet
 Frederick Thurston
 Mitsuko Uchida
 Andrea Vanzo
 Julian Lloyd Webber
 Mary O'Hara

Ensembles

 Amadeus Quartet
 Amsterdam Quartet
 Beaux Arts Trio
 Boskovsky Quartet
 Carmirelli Quartet
 Griller Quartet
 Grimethorpe Colliery Band
 Koppel Quartet
 I Musici
 Musica Vitalis Quartet
 New Italian Quartet
 Orford String Quartet
 Quartetto Italiano
 Quintetto Chigiano
 Takács Quartet
 Trio di Trieste
 Vegh Quartet
 Vienna Octet
 Polteau Instrumental Ensemble
 D'Oyly Carte Opera Company
 Choir of King's College, Cambridge
 The Purcell Singers

Orchestras

 Belgrade National Opera Orchestra
 Boyd Neel String Orchestra
 BBC Theatre Orchestra
 Amsterdam Concertgebouw Orchestra
 Hamburg Radio Symphony Orchestra
 Hungarian State Symphony Orchestra
 Kingsway Symphony Orchestra
 London Chamber Orchestra
 London Mozart Orchestra
 London Philharmonic Orchestra
 London Symphony Orchestra
 London Theatre Orchestra
 Maggio Musicale Fiorentino Orchestra
 New Symphony Orchestra
 Paris Conservatoire Orchestra
 Orchestre de la Suisse Romande
 Radio Orchestra, Beromünster
 Radio Symphony Orchestra, Copenhagen
 Santa Cecilia Orchestra
 Stockholm Radio Orchestra
 Stuttgart Chamber Orchestra
 Tonhalle Orchester Zurich
 Turin Symphony Orchestra
 Vienna Philharmonic Orchestra
 Vienna Symphony Orchestra
 Zurich Collegium Musicum

Non-classical

Film composers

 John Barry
 Jerry Goldsmith
 James Horner
 Michael Kamen
 Michael Nyman
 Alan Silvestri
 John Williams
 Hans Zimmer

Jazz and popular artists released on Decca Records (US) label

 The Andrews Sisters
 Toni Arden
 Louis Armstrong
 Banana Splits
 Len Barry
 Vincent Bell
 Elmer Bernstein & Orchestra
 Owen Bradley Quintet
 Bob Braun
 Erskine Butterfield and his Blue Boys
 Don Cherry
 Rosemary Clooney
 Deborah Cox
 Jacob Collier
 Crazy Otto
 Bing Crosby
 The Cuff Links
 Bobby Darin
 Sammy Davis Jr.
 Lenny Dee (organist)
 Jimmy Dorsey & His Orchestra
 Tommy Dorsey & His Orchestra
 The Dream Weavers
 Deanna Durbin
 Yvonne Elliman
 Duke Ellington & His Orchestra
 Paul Evans
 Eddie Fontaine
 The Four Aces
 The Free Movement
 Judy Garland
 Jimmie Gordon
 Teddy Grace
 Earl Grant
 Dobie Gray
 Glen Gray & the Casa Loma Orchestra
 Keith Green
 Bill Haley & His Comets
 Adelaide Hall
 Glass Harp
 Bobby Helms
 Woody Herman & His Orchestra
 Milt Herth Trio
 Al Hibbler
 Billie Holiday
 Burl Ives
 Al Jolson
 Bert Kaempfert
 The Kalin Twins
 Kitty Kallen & Georgie Shaw
 Sammy Kaye & His Orchestra
 The Kingston Trio
 Peggy Lee
 Jerry Lewis
 Guy Lombardo & the Royal Canadians
 Matthew's Southern Comfort
 Robert Maxwell & Orchestra
 Barrelhouse Buck McFarland
 Glenn Miller & His Orchestra
 The Mills Brothers
 Domenico Modugno (Italy)
 Russ Morgan
 Maurice Rocco
 Rick Nelson & the Stone Canyon Band
 Les Paul and His Trio
 The Peppermint Rainbow
 Artie Shaw
 Ethel Smith
 The Spokesmen
 Morris Stoloff/Columbia Pictures Orchestra
 The Surfaris
 Sylvia Syms
 Debbie Taylor
 The Tyrones
 The Weavers
 The Who
 Wishbone Ash
 Victor Young & His Orchestra
 Helmut Zacharias (Germany)

Artists under the Decca Nashville label
 Gary Allan
 Rhett Akins
 Bill Anderson
 Jan Howard
 Jeannie Seely
 Jack Greene
 Mark Chesnutt
 Patsy Cline
 Helen Darling
 Roy Drusky
 Red Foley
 Rebecca Lynn Howard
 Chris Knight
 Brenda Lee
 Ronnie Dove
 Danni Leigh
 Loretta Lynn
 Grady Martin
 Moon Mullican
 One Flew South
 Dolly Parton
 Frazier River
 Webb Pierce
 Dawn Sears
 Shane Stockton
 Conway Twitty
 Kitty Wells
 Lee Ann Womack

Pop/rock artists who had more than one hit on Decca Records (UK)

 Father Abraham and The Smurfs (Netherlands)
 Chris Andrews
 The Animals (formerly on Columbia)
 The Applejacks
 Arrival (1971 to CBS)
 Winifred Atwell
 The Bachelors (Ireland)
 Dave Berry
 The Beverley Sisters
 The Big Three
 Los Bravos (Spain)
 Max Bygraves
 The Casuals
 Frank Chacksfield
 Jess Conrad
 Lyn Cornell
 Billy Cotton and his Band (first on Rex)
 Dana (on Rex)
 Billie Davis
 Terry Dene
 Jackie Dennis
 The Dennisons
 Karl Denver
 Ken Dodd (later on Columbia)
 Val Doonican (later on Pye, Philips)
 East of Eden
 Bern Elliott and the Fenmen
 Marianne Faithfull (later on Island)
 The Fortunes (later on Capitol)
 Billy Fury (later on Polydor)
 The Goons
 Jet Harris & Tony Meehan
 Ted Heath
 Heinz (later on Columbia)
 Engelbert Humperdinck
 The Johnston Brothers
 Tom Jones (later on Epic)
 Eden Kane (later on Fontana)
 Jonathan King (later formed UK Records)
 Kathy Kirby
 Lee Lawrence
 The Lumineers
 Mike Preston
 Alan Price (several other labels)
 P.J. Proby (later on Liberty)
 The Redskins
 Joan Regan (later on Pye)
 Neil Reid
 Paddy Roberts
 Lord Rockingham's XI
 The Rolling Stones (formed Rolling Stones Records in 1970)
 Lita Roza
 Paul & Barry Ryan
 Crispian St. Peters
 Doug Sheldon
 Peter Skellern
 The Small Faces (to Immediate in 1967)
 Cyril Stapleton
 The Stargazers
 The Sundowners
 Thin Lizzy (to Phonogram in 1974)
 Tommy Steele
 Them (to Tower Records in 1967)
 The Tornados
 Twinkle
 Unit 4 + 2
 Dickie Valentine (later on Pye Nixa)
 The Vernons Girls
 The Warriors
 David Whitfield
 Mark Wynter (later on Pye)
 Jimmy Young (formerly Polygon, later Columbia)
 The Zombies (CBS from 1967)

Pop/crossover artists

 AURORA 
 Tori Amos
 Alexandra Burke
 Kerry Ellis
 Clay Aiken
 Bond
 Boyz II Men
 Jodie Brooke Wilson
 Amy MacDonald
 Delta Goodrem
 The Love Willows
 Boz Scaggs
 David Sanborn
 Charlie Haden
 Brendan James
 Sonya Kitchell
 Najofondo
 Paula Cole
 Duel
 Matt Dusk
 Ludovico Einaudi
 Red Moon
 Rick Guard
 Louis Jordan
 Ute Lemper
 Annie Lennox
 Ashley MacIsaac
 Dominic Miller
 Morrissey
 Aziza Mustafa Zadeh
 Kristyna Myles
 Donny Osmond
 Ana Salazar
 Eimear Quinn
 Andrea Vanzo
 Vocal Sampling
 Russell Watson
 Hayley Westenra
 Imelda May
 Joe McElderry
 Kimberley Walsh

See also
 List of one-hit wonders on the UK Singles Chart

External links
 Decca Records Web Page
 Decca Classics Web Page
 Decca Broadway Web Page
 Universal Music Classical Web Page

Decca Records